Nowjan (also Romanized as Nowjān and Nūjān; also known as Tūjān) is a village in Adaran Rural District, Asara District, Karaj County, Alborz Province, Iran. At the 2006 census, its population was 328, in 98 families.

References 

Populated places in Karaj County